Proino ANT1 is a television morning program airs on ANT1 on 17 October 2011 every Monday to Friday at 7am to 10am, It was hosted by Yiorgos Papadakis. Sissy of 11:00.

See also
List of programs broadcast by ANT1

ANT1 original programming
Greek television news shows
2011 Greek television series debuts
2015 Greek television series endings
2010s Greek television series
Greek-language television shows